The Daylight Saving for South East Queensland Referendum Bill 2010 was tabled in the Queensland Parliament on 14 April 2010, by Independent Member Peter Wellington. Wellington has called for a referendum to be held at the next State election on introduction of daylight saving time for South East Queensland. The Bill proposes a split-time zone for the state of Queensland and has suggested that the local government areas of Brisbane, Gold Coast, Sunshine Coast, Ipswich, Logan, Scenic Rim, Redland and Moreton Bay be included in the daylight saving time zone, while the rest of the state remains on standard time.

Drafting
In early 2010, the Daylight Saving for South East Queensland (DS4SEQ) political party approached Wellington to introduce a private member's bill. As Wellington agreed with the principles of the DS4SEQ proposal, specifically the dual time zone arrangement, he drafted the Daylight Saving for South East Queensland Referendum Bill 2010.

Response
In response to this bill, Leader of the Opposition John-Paul Langbroek, immediately announced that he would not support the bill, saying "We will not be supporting a referendum on daylight saving," and "I don't want to make an interstate problem an intrastate problem."

The Premier of Queensland, Anna Bligh, announced a community consultation process, which resulted in over 74,000 respondents participating, 64 per cent of whom supported a trial of daylight saving, while 63 per cent were also in favour of holding a referendum. On 7 June 2010, and after reviewing the favourable consultation results, Bligh announced that her Government would not support the bill because regional Queenslanders were overwhelmingly opposed to daylight saving. DS4SEQ called for Bligh and her government to reconsider their position.

The bill was defeated in Queensland Parliament on 15 June 2011.

Previous daylight saving referendum
Queensland has had one previous referendum on daylight saving, which was held on 22 February 1992, with the question: "Are you in favour of daylight saving?", which was defeated with a 54.5 per cent 'no' vote. The vote on this referendum was after Queensland had trialled daylight saving over a three-year period, from 1989/90 to 1991/92. The referendum result displayed a distinct trend—that public opinion on daylight saving in Queensland is geographically divided, with the 'no' vote strongest in the north and west regional districts, while the 'yes' vote was strongest in the state's metropolitan south-east.

See also
 Time in Australia
 Daylight saving time around the world

References

External links
Daylight Saving for South East Queensland Referendum Bill 2010
Daylight Saving for South East Queensland Party official website

Referendums in Queensland
2010 in Australia
Daylight saving time in Australia
2010s in Queensland